The Color of Money is a 1986 film directed by Martin Scorsese.

The Color of Money or The Colour of Money may also refer to:

 The Color of Money (novel), a 1984 novel by Walter Tevis, loosely adapted into the film
The Color of Money, a 1988 series of investigative reports by Bill Dedman
 The Colour of Money (game show), a 2009 British game show
 The Colour of Money, a customer magazine of Triodos Bank

See also
 "What's the Colour of Money?", a 1986 song by Hollywood Beyond